Liucun Township is a township of Neihuang County in northern Henan province, China. , it has 22 villages under its administration:
Yangsang Village
Guosang Village
Zhangsang Village
Xue Village
Pochekou Village
Wenxinggu Village
Maxinggu Village
Liuxinggu Village
Shangzhuang Village
Qiankou Village
Maji Village
Zhaozhuang Village
Qianhua Village
Zhonghua Village
Houhua Village
Taiping Village
Beiliu Village
Yuanliu Village
Dailiu Village
Chenliu Village
Muliu Village
Jiao Village

See also
List of township-level divisions of Henan

References

Township-level divisions of Henan
Neihuang County